Karl Ludwig Diehl (14 August 1896 – 8 March 1958) was a German film actor. He appeared in 66 films between 1924 and 1957. His father was Karl Diehl, the German professor of Anarchism.

Filmography

 Die Tragödie der Entehrten (1924)
 The Blame (1924)
 Waltz of Love (1930) - Marshal
 Masks (1930) - Stuart Webbs
 Zärtlichkeit (1930) - Kerten
 The Love Waltz (1930) - Lord Chamberlain
 Love's Carnival (1930) - Oberleutnant Ferndinand von Grobitzsch
 The Copper (1930) - Snorry (German Version)
 Ash Wednesday (1931) - Hauptmann von Rochow
 Queen of the Night (1931) - Adjudant
 Circus Life (1931) - Luftakrobat
 Täter gesucht (1931) - Dr. Gregor, Redakteur
 The Squeaker (1931) - Captain Leslie
 In the Employ of the Secret Service (1931) - Wasiljeff, kaptajn
 Rasputin, Demon with Women (1932) - Fürst Jussupoff
 Two in a Car (1932) - Lord Kingsdale
 A Shot at Dawn (1932) - Petersen
 Scampolo (1932) - Maximilian
 The Secret of Johann Orth (1932) - Johann Salvator (Johann Orth)
 The Invisible Front (1933) - Erik Larsen
 Spies at Work (1933) - Michael von Hombergk, Generalstabsoffizier
 On Secret Service (1933) - Captain von Homberg
 Volldampf voraus! (1934) - Axel Gröning, Oberleutnant zur See, Kommandant
 The Girlfriend of a Big Man (1934) - Peters, Fabrikant
 Adventure on the Southern Express (1934) - Hans Lenzfeld, Speisewagenkellner
 Ein Mann will nach Deutschland (1934) - Hagen
 Der stählerne Strahl (1935) - Michael Tetjus
 Episode (1935) - Karl Kinz
 An Ideal Husband (1935) - Lord Robert Chiltern
The Green Domino (1935) - Dr. Bruck
 The Higher Command (1935) - Rittmeister von Droste
 The Emperor's Candlesticks (1936) - Georg Wolenski
 His Daughter is Called Peter (1936) - Ingenieur Max Klaar
 Es geht um mein Leben (1936) - Rechtsanwalt Dr. Edmund Lessner
 Liebe geht seltsame Wege (1937) - Hauptmann Costali / Haushofmeister Archibald
 Love Can Lie (1937) - Ivar Andersson
 Another World (1937) - Prinz Selim
 The Man Who Couldn't Say No (1938) - Memmo Speranza
 The False Step (1939) - Baron von Instetten
 A Hopeless Case (1939) - Professor Dr. Bruchsal
 The Fox of Glenarvon (1940) - Baron John Ennis of Loweland
 The Swedish Nightingale (1941) - Count Rantzan
 Annelie (1941) - Dr. Martin Laborius
 Was geschah in dieser Nacht (1941) - Johannes Petersen
 The Big Game (1942) - SS-Mann
 Die Entlassung (1942) - Kaiser Friederich III.
 5 June (1942) - Generalmajor Lüchten
 Nacht ohne Abschied (1943) - Oberst Gösta Knudson, Schwadronführer
 Die Hochstaplerin (1944) - Michael Jürgens
 Wo ist Herr Belling? (1945) - Herr von Seidel
 The Appeal to Conscience (1949) - Kriminalrat Husfeld
 The Trip to Marrakesh (1949) - Professor Colbert
 The Accusation (1950) - Massimo Ruska
 Das seltsame Leben des Herrn Bruggs (1951) - Herr von Seidel - Schwager Bruggs
 My Heart Sings (1951) - Neurologo
 Until We Meet Again (1952) - Prof. Stauffer
 Beloved Life (1953) - Oberst von Bolin
 A Love Story (1954) - Oberst Kessler, Regiments-Kommandeur
 The Man of My Life (1954) - Professor Bergstetten
 Victoria in Dover (1954) - Lord Melbourne - Prime Minister
 Secrets of the City (1955) - Prof. Siebrecht
 The Devil's General (1955) - Generaldirektor Hugo Mohrungen
 Jackboot Mutiny (1955) - Generaloberst a.D. Beck
 Bandits of the Autobahn (1955) - Polizeirat Gerber
 My Leopold (1955) - Schwalbach, Banker
 My Sixteen Sons (1956) - Dr. Wesendahl

References

External links

Karl Ludwig Diehl at Virtual History

1896 births
1958 deaths
German male film actors
German male silent film actors
20th-century German male actors